Patrick Sellers (born December 28, 1968) is an American basketball coach and former player who is currently the head coach at Central Connecticut State University.

Head coaching record

References

External links 
 Central Connecticut profile

1968 births
Living people
Sportspeople from Florence, South Carolina
Basketball players from South Carolina
Basketball coaches from South Carolina
Shooting guards
Central Connecticut Blue Devils men's basketball players
American expatriate basketball people in the United Kingdom
High school basketball coaches in Connecticut
Central Connecticut Blue Devils men's basketball coaches
UMass Minutemen basketball coaches
UConn Huskies men's basketball coaches
American expatriate basketball people in China
Shanxi Zhongyu coaches
Hofstra Pride men's basketball coaches
Creighton Bluejays men's basketball coaches
DePaul Blue Demons men's basketball coaches
Fairleigh Dickinson Knights men's basketball coaches
Fairfield Stags men's basketball coaches